The Cessna 150 is a two-seat tricycle gear general aviation airplane that was designed for flight training, touring and personal use. In 1977, it was succeeded in production by the Cessna 152, a minor modification to the original design.

The Cessna 150 is the fifth most produced aircraft ever, with 23,839 produced. The Cessna 150 was offered for sale in named configurations that included the Standard basic model, the Trainer with dual controls, and the deluxe Commuter, along with special options for these known as Patroller options. Later, these configurations were joined by the top-end Commuter II and the aerobatic Aerobat models.

In 2007, Cessna announced a successor to the Model 150 and 152, the Model 162 Skycatcher.

Development

Development of the Model 150 began in the mid-1950s with the decision by Cessna Aircraft to produce a successor to the popular Cessna 140 which finished production in 1951. The main changes in the 150 design were the use of tricycle landing gear, which is easier to learn to use than the tailwheel landing gear of the Cessna 140, and replacing the rounded wingtips and horizontal and vertical stabilizers with more modern, squared-off profiles.  In addition, the narrow, hinged wing flaps of the 140 were replaced by larger, far more effective Fowler flaps.

The Cessna 150 prototype first flew on September 12, 1957, with production commencing in September 1958 at Cessna's Wichita, Kansas, plant. 1,764 aircraft were also produced by Reims Aviation under license in France. These French manufactured 150s were designated Reims F-150, the "F" indicating they were built in France.

Most Reims-built aircraft are powered by a Continental O-200-A built under license by Rolls-Royce, but some have the Rolls-Royce-built version of the Continental O-240-A.

All models from 1966 onwards have larger doors and increased baggage space. With the 1967 Model 150G, the doors were bowed outwards  on each side to provide more cabin elbow room.

The 150 was succeeded in the summer of 1977 by the closely related Cessna 152. The 152 is more economical to operate due to the increased TBO (time between overhaul) of the Lycoming O-235 engine. The 152 had its flap travel limited to 30 degrees, from the 150's 40 degree flap deflection, for better climb with full flaps and the maximum certified gross weight was increased from 1,600 lb (726 kg) on the 150 to 1670 lb (757 kg) on the 152. Production of the 152 ended in 1985 when manufacturing of all Cessna piston singles was suspended.

Production
 
A total of 22,138 Cessna 150s were built in the United States, including 21,404 Commuters and 734 Aerobats. Reims Aviation completed 1,764 F-150s, of which 1,428 were Commuters and 336 were Aerobats. A Reims affiliate in Argentina also assembled 47 F-150s, including 38 Commuters and 9 Aerobats.

Of all the Cessna 150-152 models, the 1966 model year was the most plentiful with 3,067 1966 Cessna 150s produced. This was the first year the aircraft featured a swept tail fin, increased baggage area and electrically operated flaps.

Variants
Cessna has historically used model years like the U.S. automobile industry, with new models typically being introduced a few months prior to the actual calendar year.

150
The 1959 and 1960 model years of the Cessna 150 had no suffix letter.

The configurations available were the "Standard", the most basic level with the fewest features; the upgraded "Trainer", with dual flight controls, a more complete set of flight instruments for instrument flight rules operation, a radio, a landing light, and a few other features; and the top-of-the-line "Inter-City Commuter" (often called simply the "Commuter"), which added an engine vacuum pump, vacuum-driven heading and attitude indicators, and a revolving anti-collision beacon mounted on the vertical fin, along with all of the Trainer's features except for the dual flight controls. The cost was US$6,995 for the Standard, $7,940 for the Trainer, and $8,545 for the Commuter.

For the 1960 model, the generator in the Commuter was upgraded to 35 amperes. All 150s for 1959 had included a 20-ampere generator, and this was retained in the Standard and Trainer for 1960; the 35-ampere generator was offered as an option for these configurations. Also for 1960, "Patroller" options were introduced for patrol-type work.

Production was 122 in 1958, 648 in 1959 and 354 in 1960.

150A
The 1961 model incorporated enough changes to justify a suffix letter and thus was designated the "150A". The most obvious change was in the rear side windows, which were 15% larger for slightly better rear visibility. This shift of the main wheels made the aircraft less likely to tip back onto its tail during loading, and it also made the nose wheel bear more weight, which increased its steering effectiveness.

Other new features in the 150A were an instrument panel with a completely redesigned layout; flush inside door handles and nearly flush window latches, which made the 150's narrow cabin a bit less cramped; and an option for individually adjustable seats. 344 of the 150A were constructed.

150B
The 150B was the 1962 model. It replaced the former standard propeller, the Sensenich M69CK-52, with the McCauley 1A100/MCM6950. The optional two-passenger child seat for the baggage compartment, available from the very first 150, was completely redesigned for the 150B. A new option was a simple autopilot, specifically for the Commuter version, called "Nav-O-Matic", a single-axis heading-hold type. Also newly offered for the 150B were optional "courtesy lights" in the underside of the wings to light the area around the doors when on the ground. The "Patroller" message drop tube option, on the other hand, was eliminated. 331 "B" models were built. The Commuter version cost US$8,995.

150C
The 1963 model, the 150C, added a quick drain to the fuel strainer, and it offered an option for larger 6.00×6 inch (150×150 mm) main wheels and tires to replace the standard 5.00×5 inch (125×125 mm) size. Also, the optional landing gear "speed fairings" were changed to a sharp-nosed design compatible with those used for other single-engine Cessna models. 472 of the 150C were completed.

150D
The 150D model for 1964 brought the first major change to the 150's look—the introduction of a wraparound rear window under the marketing name Omni-Vision, following the pattern already set by other Cessna models. The new rear window improved rearward visibility, and many people found the new cabin more "airy" and pleasant, due to the increased light.

Because of the higher gross weight with the same engine power, Cessna's claimed performance figures for the 150D and later models are worse than for earlier models: maximum and cruise speeds are reduced, range is shortened, takeoff and landing distances are lengthened, and climb rate and service ceiling are lower. Such changes are only to be expected, because performance is weight-dependent and is normally specified at maximum gross weight. Cruise performance may also have been lessened because the new rear window made the 150D's rear fuselage less well streamlined than the former "fastback" fuselage.

The 150D retained the straight tailfin and rudder of previous years. However, to lighten control loads, aerodynamic balance horns were added to the rudder and the elevator. These horns also contained weights (mass balances) to eliminate any possible control flutter that might be induced by the changed aerodynamics of the rear fuselage.

The 150D moved the heavy electrical battery from the previous rear location, behind the baggage compartment, to the front, just ahead of the engine firewall. It had a broader range for its center of gravity than earlier models, which allowed more flexibility in loading.

Partway through the 150D's production, an option was added for a heavy-duty nose landing gear with a larger 6.00×6 inch (150×150 mm) nosewheel; this had a tire whose tread was wider than standard but was only slightly larger in diameter. The folding torque links on this heavy-duty nose gear were also reversed, being mounted in front of the nosewheel strut instead of behind it. 804 150Ds were built.

150E
The 1965 Cessna 150E saw only minor changes, like the addition of an optional rear-view mirror. The "E" model saw production increase to 1637 aircraft.

150F
The 1966 model, the 150F, was greatly changed from previous versions, most obviously in its appearance: the vertical tail was swept back 35 degrees, with a short dorsal strake at its base, matching the styling of the Cessna 172 and other models. The cabin doors were widened, with 23% more area, and while the old doors were tapered at the bottom, the new doors were square, making it easier to get in and out of the cabin. The new doors also had larger windows and better latches. The cabin floor was now flat, with no hump for routing control cables. The old manual flaps were replaced by electrically driven flaps activated by a switch on the instrument panel; other former floor controls (the elevator trim wheel and fuel shutoff valve) were now on a small vertical console beneath the panel. The electric flaps now had a flap position indicator above the left door. The 6.00×6 inch (150×150 mm) main wheels with large low-pressure tires were now standard rather than optional, and they had new brakes. The stall warning alert, previously an electric beeper, was now a pneumatic reed horn that would work even if electrical power failed. The pointed propeller spinner and rear-view mirror options became standard for the Commuter and Trainer. Other newly standard features for the Commuter were dual controls (previously restricted to the Trainer), wheel speed fairings, and an electric heater for the pitot tube and stall warning sensor. The old optional Patroller-type door (with an extra window in the lower half) was dropped along with the name "Patroller", though long-range fuel tanks were still offered. The courtesy light option was also discontinued.

Cessna greatly expanded 150 production for the 150F; a total of 3087 of this model were produced. The 1966 model year would be the single most-produced model year in 150 production history. (More 150Ls and 150Ms would be produced later, but those were spread out over several model years.) The 1966 model year was also the first production of French Reims-built F150s, with 67 built as the F150F.

The 1967 model, the 150G, looked quite similar to the 150F but had many internal changes. The doors were bowed outward to make the cabin about  wider, and the floor was lowered to add head room. Rubber sound isolators were added to the engine cowling to reduce vibration and noise in the cabin. The cabin heating system now allowed heated air to be mixed with fresh air and had a new windshield defroster outlet. The instrument panel's layout was changed, and the control yokes now had open tops. Both of the old electrical generators, 20-ampere and 35-ampere, were replaced by a new 60-ampere alternator. The anti-collision beacon (standard on the Commuter, optional elsewhere) was changed from the old motorized revolving type to a new flashing type. Separately adjustable bucket seats were now standard for the Commuter and could be either fabric- or vinyl-covered. The Commuter got standard wall-to-wall carpet. Tinted windows were a new option.

The 150G was also the first Cessna 150 variant certified for floats. A total of 2114 150G models were built by Cessna; another 152 were built by Reims in France as the F150G.

150H
The 1968 model, the 150H, differed externally from the 150G only in adding streamlined speed fairings at the ends of the wing struts. The electric flap switch was now a three-way switch: when pushed upward to raise flaps, it would stay in that position, making this operation "hands-off", but lowering the flaps still required holding the switch downward. The flap position indicator was now vertical, on the left front doorpost, and the center console was narrowed to improve legroom. A new wing leveler option could automatically control the ailerons and rudder to keep the aircraft on course. 2007 150Hs were built in Wichita, with 170 built by Reims as the F150H.

150I	
There was no model "150I" as Cessna didn't want the capital letter I to be confused with a numeral 1. (Despite this, for 1968 there had been a 172I model of the Cessna 172.)

150J
The 1969 model was the 150J, which externally looked identical to the 150H. The 150J's biggest change was its instrument panel layout, which finally adopted the "basic-T" arrangement that would be used for all later 150 models. The 150J also had rocker-style electrical switches instead of the former pull-type ones, and a new key-operated combined magneto/starter-switch replaced the old "pull-style" starter. The new starter was more "car-like" but not as reliable as the old one and also more expensive to repair. New options were a map light under the control wheel and a ground power plug, and extra steps and handles were added to the floatplane version to make fueling easier. 1714 "J" models were built, plus 140 built by Reims as the F150J.

For the 1970 model, the 150K, Cessna added a split master switch that could turn off the alternator separately, a ground-adjustable rudder trim tab, a new molded cabin headliner, and new seats with greater legroom. New options included tinted dual overhead skylights for upward visibility, extra steps and handles to aid in fueling, whitewall tires, and "conically cambered" wingtips that curved downward toward the trailing edge. On the 150K Commuter, the cambered wingtips were standard.

The biggest change in the 150K, however, was the addition of a new version certified for aerobatics, the A150K Aerobat. The Aerobat retained the normal 150's  Continental O-200 engine, but structurally it was stronger than the normal 150K, being rated for load factors of +6.0/−3.0 g (vs. +4.4/–1.76 g for the normal 150K) and having higher limits for its maneuvering and never-exceed speeds. Other Aerobat standard features included the dual skylights already mentioned, shoulder harnesses for both occupants, removable seat backs and cushions to make room for a back-pack or seat-pack parachute, jettisonable doors, and a special checkerboard paint scheme; there was also an optional accelerometer for the instrument panel. The Aerobat was approved for a variety of maneuvers that were not permitted for normal 150s, but it still had the normal 150's gravity-fed fuel system, so sustained inverted flight was not possible. A 1970 A150K Aerobat cost $12,000 as opposed to the $11,450 price for a 150K Commuter model.

A total of 832 "K" models were built, including A150Ks. Reims built 129 as the F150K and 81 as the FA150K.

150L
The 150L had the longest production run of any 150 sub-model, being produced 1971–74.

New in 1971 were tubular landing gear legs with a 16% greater width (6 feet 6 inches (1.98 m) to 7 feet 7 inches (2.31 m) for better ground handling. These replaced the previous flat steel leaf spring gear. Also in 1971, the landing and taxi lights were moved from the wing leading edge to the nose bowl to better illuminate the ground. They were an improvement, but bulb life was reduced due to the heat and vibration of that location. They were moved back to the wing on the 1984 model Cessna 152.

The "L" also introduced a longer dorsal strake that reached to the rear window. This was done more for styling than for aerodynamics and the empty weight accordingly went up  over the "K". 879 were built in 1971.

In 1972 the "L" received new fuel filler caps to reduce moisture seepage, and better seats and seat tracks. 1100 were built in 1972.

The 1973 "L" model brought in lower seats to provide more headroom for taller pilots. 1460 of the 1973 models were built.

The final "L" model was produced in 1974.

Total "L" production was 4519, plus the 485 built by Reims as the F150L and 39 FA150L Aerobats. An additional 39 were built in Argentina by DINFIA as the A-150L.

FRA150L Aerobat
Reims produced a variant of the FA150L Aerobat with a Rolls-Royce Continental O-240-A engine, 141 built.

The final Cessna 150 model was the 150M. It introduced the "Commuter II" upgrade package that included many optional avionics and trim items as standard. This increased the rudder and fin area by 15% to improve crosswind handling.
The "M" was produced for three years: 1975–77. The United States Air Force Academy uses M variant (designated the T-51) for training and competition.

Inertia-reel restraints became available as an option with the 1975 model year. 1269 1975 model 150Ms were built.

In 1976 the "M" gained a suite of electrical circuit breakers to replace the previous fuses used. It was also fitted with a fully articulated pilot seat as standard equipment (this seat had been optional on some earlier models). 1399 were built.

The 1977 model year was the last for the Cessna 150. It added only "pre-select" flaps, allowing the pilot to set the flaps to any position without the pilot having to hold the switch during flap travel, enabling the pilot to concentrate on other flying duties. Only 427 1977 model 150Ms were built as production shifted to the improved Cessna 152 in the early part of 1977.

The many refinements incorporated into the 150 over the years had cost the aircraft a lot of useful load.

A total of 3097 "M" models were built during its three-year run. An additional 285 were built by Reims as the F150M and 141 FA150M Aerobats. Reims also built 75 A150Ls with F150M modifications.

FRA150M
Reims produced a variant of the Rolls-Royce Continental O-240-A powered FRA150L Aerobat with the same improvements as the F150M, 75 built.

Modifications available

There are hundreds of modifications available for the Cessna 150.  Some of the most frequently installed include:
 Vortex generators and STOL kits that reduce the stall speed of the plane.
 Flap gap seals to reduce drag and increase rate of climb.
 Different wing tips, some of which claim various cruise speed increases and stall speed reductions.
 Auto fuel STCs, which permit the use of automobile fuel instead of the more expensive aviation fuel.
 Taildragger landing gear.
 Auxiliary fuel tanks for larger capacity.
 Door catches to replace the factory ones that often fail in service.
 Belly fuel drain valves to drain fuel from the lowest point in the fuel system.

The Aviat 150 is an overhauled and rebuilt Cessna 150 by Aviat.

Noteworthy flights
 On September 12, 1994, Frank Eugene Corder intentionally crashed a Cessna 150L onto the South Lawn of the White House against the south wall of the Executive Mansion, in an apparent suicide. Corder was killed, but no one else was injured and damage to property on the ground was minimal.
 In 1996, a Cessna 150 was flown from the United States to South Africa in several stages, crossing the Atlantic along the way. An extra 60 gallon fuel tank was installed (beyond the standard 22.5 gallons) and the plane took off  over gross weight.

Operators

Civil
The aircraft is popular with flying schools as well as private individuals.

Military

Burundi Air Force

Congo Democratic Air Force

Ecuadorian Air Force

Ivory Coast Air Force

Liberian Army

Mexican Naval Aviation

Paraguayan Naval Aviation

Somali Air Force

Sri Lanka Air Force

United States Air Force Academy

Notable accidents
27 March 1968. The Cessna was destroyed during the collision with the DC-9 and the subsequent impact with the ground, and both of its occupants were killed. The DC-9 sustained light damage and was able to land safely; none of its 44 passengers or five crewmembers were injured. The probable cause was determined to be a combination of inadequate visual flight rules (VFR) procedures in place at the airport, the failure of the DC-9 crew to notice the other aircraft in time, the controller's failure to ensure that the Cessna had received and understood important landing information, and the Cessna crew's deviation from their traffic pattern instructions and/or their continuation to a critical point in the traffic pattern without informing the controller of the progress of the flight.
 4 August 1968. The cabin section of the northwest-bound Cessna embedded itself in the Convair's forward baggage compartment. The Convair lost electrical power and its right engine was shut down due to a damaged propeller; the captain completed a successful emergency landing six minutes later. All three occupants aboard the Cessna were killed and the first officer on the Convair was seriously injured, but the other three crew and eight passengers were uninjured. The Cessna was on a VFR flight from Lombard, Illinois, to Sheboygan County Memorial Airport in Sheboygan Falls, Wisconsin. It was determined that the inability of the Convair 580 flight crew to detect the Cessna 150 visually in sufficient time to take evasive action, despite having been provided with three radar traffic advisories, caused the crash. The crew's visual detection capabilities were reduced by heavy insect smears on the Convair's cockpit windows that had accumulated during the flight. Visibility was further reduced by haze, smoke and sunglare, and by the Cessna's inconspicuous color and its lack of relative motion as the two aircraft converged.
 9 January 1971. Cessna 150J N60942, conducting a student training flight for Linden Flight Service, Inc., collided with American Airlines Flight 30, a Boeing 707-323C, at about 2,975 feet over Edison, New Jersey, while the 707 was on approach to Newark Airport. The Cessna ran head-on into the 707's outer left wing and went out of control due to impact damage, crashing and killing both its occupants. The 707, although itself damaged, landed safely in Newark; there were no injuries among its 14 passengers and 7 crew. The NTSB found the cause to be "the inability of the crews of both aircraft to see and avoid each other while operating in a system which permits VFR aircraft to operate up to 3,000 feet on random headings and altitudes in a congested area under conditions of reduced visibility."
 4 August 1971. Cessna 150J N61011, conducting a student training flight for Floyd Flying Service, collided with Continental Air Lines Flight 712, a Boeing 707-324C, at about 3,950 feet over Compton, California, while the 707 was making a nighttime approach into Los Angeles International Airport (LAX). The Cessna 150 hit the 707's outer right wing and was severely damaged, but the instructor pilot retained enough control to make a successful crash landing in a field next to a lighted golf course; although the Cessna was destroyed, its occupants both survived with injuries. The 707's outer right wing was damaged, but the aircraft landed safely at LAX, and none of its 87 passengers and 9 crewmembers were injured. According to the NTSB, the cause was "the minimum opportunity for the flightcrews to see and avoid the other aircraft due to the background lights behind the Cessna and the decrease in the Cessna pilots' visual field resulting from the aircraft's wing while turning".
 9 January 1975. Cessna 150H N50430, a rented aircraft owned by Cavalier Flyers Inc., collided with a United States Air Force Convair VT-29D (a military version of the CV-340) at night over the James River off Newport News, Virginia, while the Convair was on an instrument landing system approach to Langley Air Force Base. The collision killed all aboard both aircraft: the Cessna's pilot and passenger and the Convair's five crew and two passengers. The National Transportation Safety Board found the probable cause to be "the human limitation inherent in the see-and-avoid concept, which can be critical in a terminal area with a combination of controlled and uncontrolled traffic", and recommended stricter traffic control procedures for the high-traffic area around Newport News and Langley.
9 January 1975. Golden West Airlines Flight 261, a de Havilland Canada DHC-6 Twin Otter, collided with Cessna 150 N11421 at Whittier, California, while on approach to Los Angeles International Airport, killing all 14 people on both planes.
7 July 2015. Cessna 150M N3601V was involved in a mid-air collision with a General Dynamics F-16CJ Fighting Falcon over Moncks Corner, South Carolina, United States. Both occupants of the Cessna were killed; the pilot of the F-16 ejected safely.

Specifications (1976 Commuter II)

See also

Notes

References

Bibliography

 Cessna 150 Type Certificate Data Sheet No. 3A19, Federal Aviation Administration

 Andrade, John. Militair 1982, Aviation Press Limited, London, 1982, 
 Simpson, R.W. Airlife's General Aviation, Airlife Publishing, England, 1991, 
 Taylor, John W. R. Jane's All The World's Aircraft 1976–77. London: Jane's Yearbooks, 1976. .

External links

 Airliners.net - Aircraft Data - Cessna 150 & 152 
 Cessna 152 Aerobat - Smithsonian National Air and Space Museum website
 Cessna 150/152 Model History

150
High-wing aircraft
Single-engined tractor aircraft
1950s United States civil trainer aircraft
1950s United States civil utility aircraft
Aircraft first flown in 1957